Jacobus Johannes Henricus "Jacques" Hanegraaf (born 14 December 1960) is a retired road bicycle racer from the Netherlands, who was a professional rider from 1981 to 1994. He twice won the Dutch title in the men's road race (1981 and 1985). His other major wins include the 1984 Amstel Gold Race. He also competed in the individual road race and team time trial events at the 1980 Summer Olympics.

Major results

1980
Ronde van Midden-Nederland
1981
Maastricht
  Dutch National Road Race Championship
's Heerenhoek
Maastricht-Amby
1982
Grand Prix of Aargau Canton
Galder
Paris–Brussels
1983
Zwevezele
1984
Acht van Chaam
Amstel Gold Race
Rotterdam
Zuiddorpe
Made
Ede
Meerssen
Diemen
1984 Tour de France:
Winner intermediate sprints classification
Wearing yellow jersey for two days
1985
Breda
Elfstedenronde
  Dutch National Road Race Championship
Zuiderzee Derny tour
1987
Zwevezele
1988
Omloop Leiedal
Made
1989
GP Liberation
1992
Malderen
Veenendaal–Veenendaal
Helchteren

See also
 List of Dutch Olympic cyclists
 List of Dutch cyclists who have led the Tour de France general classification

References

External links 

1960 births
Living people
Dutch male cyclists
Olympic cyclists of the Netherlands
Cyclists at the 1980 Summer Olympics
Cyclists from Zundert